Charles Herron may refer to:

 Charles D. Herron (1877–1977), United States Army general
 Charles Lee Herron (born 1937), American former fugitive
 Charles H. Fairbanks (1913–1984), American anthropologist